"Beautiful World" is a song by Japanese musician Hikaru Utada. It served as the theme song for Evangelion: 1.0 You Are (Not) Alone, the 2007 film reboot of the anime Neon Genesis Evangelion. It was released as a double A-side single on August 29, 2007 along with their song "Kiss & Cry", which had been released digitally three months earlier. In 2009, a remix of the song, "Beautiful World (Planitb Acoustica Mix)" served as the theme song of the second film in the series, Evangelion: 2.0 You Can (Not) Advance.

Background and development 

In 2006, Utada released their fifth studio album, Ultra Blue, led by the digital single "This Is Love". In February 2007, Utada released "Flavor of Life", the theme song for the drama Hana Yori Dango Returns, which became one of their most commercially successful singles, selling over eight million downloads and becoming the second most digitally successful song of 2007 globally.

On April 20, Utada's song "Kiss & Cry" began to be used in commercials for Nissin Foods' Freedom Project advertising campaign, and was released as a digital download on May 31. Utada's recording of the jazz standard "Fly Me to the Moon", originally found on their "Wait & See (Risk)" (2000) single, was rearranged and released as a digital download on June 29. Renditions of this song had previously been used in the original Neon Genesis Evangelion animation's soundtrack, and Utada's version was used in trailers for Evangelion: 1.0 You Are (Not) Alone.

Since Utada had not read the movie's script before writing the theme songs for any of the first three Rebuild movies, Utada took her inspirations from Shinji wanting to see his friends and the real world again at the end of End of Evangelion, and Asuka's realization that she did desire love from other people. Utada's relationship with her mother, a musician herself, and her mental illness later in life influenced her Evangelion songs. For this reason, out of all Eva characters she identified the most with Asuka.

Promotion and release 

"Beautiful World" debuted on the radio and was released as a ringtone on July 23, 2007. In early September, Utada performed the song at many music entertainment programs in Japan: at Count Down TV on the night of September 1, Hey! Hey! Hey! Music Champ on September 3, Utaban on September 6, and both Music Station and Music Fighter on September 7. "Beautiful World" was performed during Utada's two date concert series Wild Life in December 2010.

Articles about Utada appeared in music and fashion magazines in August and September 2007, to promote the single. This included R&R Newsmaker, What's In?, CD Data, Barfout!, Oricon Style, Pia, Pop Teen and Patipati.

Planitb Acoustica Remix 

In 2009, the song was rearranged for the second film of the Rebuild of Evangelion series, as "Beautiful World (Planitb Acoustica Mix)". It was released as a digital download on June 28, 2009. Utada worked with Russell McNamara, who had previously made remixes of their songs "Distance", "Traveling", "Hikari" and "Simple and Clean" between 2001–2002. The song was commercially successful, reaching number 8 on the Billboard Japan Hot 100. It was added as the final track of Utada's second compilation album Utada Hikaru Single Collection Vol. 2 in late 2010.

Da Capo Version 
In 2021, Utada re-recorded  the song (specified as a "self cover") for the last film of the Evangelion series, Evangelion: 3.0+1.0 Thrice Upon a Time, entitled "Beautiful World (Da Capo Version)", which featured on their 2021 EP, One Last Kiss. Musically, the Da Capo version immediately follows on from the preceding song, "One Last Kiss".

Director Hideaki Anno specifically requested the version be created as he believed "One Last Kiss" would not be long enough for the credit sequence.

Music videos 

Two animated music videos were produced for the song, depicting scenes from Evangelion. The first was released at the time of the single's release, and featured scenes of Evangelion: 1.0 You Are (Not) Alone, directed by the film's chief director Hideaki Anno. This music video won a Japanese MTV Video Music Award for the best video used for a film.

In 2014 to promote Utada's 15th anniversary, as well as the tribute album Utada Hikaru no Uta, a music video of Evangelion scenes was produced by Kazuya Tsurumaki, one of the co-directors of the Rebuild of Evangelion film series.

Critical reception 

CDJournal reviewers described Utada as singing about "earnest love and deep prayers in a rhythmic tempo", and noted "a painful beauty where transience and passion live together" in the song. They praised the "melancholy" way that Utada sings the lyric "it's only love", as well as the lyrics' sense of ironic while coming from an everyday perspective. Tetsuo Hiraga of Hot Express gave an extremely positive review of the song, feeling in awe of the emotional sensitivity of Utada's lyrics and how well they resonated with Evangelion.

Track listings

Personnel

Personnel details were sourced from "Beautiful World" / "Kiss & Cry"'s liner notes booklet.

Goetz B. for 365 Artists – mixing
Atsushi Matsui – recording
Akira Miyake – production
Alexis Smith – additional programming
Yuzuru Tomita – additional programming
Hikaru Utada – arrangement, keyboards, programming, production, songwriting, vocals
Teruzane Utada – production

Chart rankings

Sales and certifications

Release history

References

External links
 

2007 singles
2007 songs
2009 singles
Hikaru Utada songs
Japanese-language songs
Songs written by Hikaru Utada
Japanese film songs
Neon Genesis Evangelion songs
Songs written for animated films
EMI Music Japan singles